Country Strong is a soundtrack album for the film of the same name. It was released by RCA Nashville on October 26, 2010. It is preceded by two singles: the title track, performed by the film's star Gwyneth Paltrow, which was released on July 26, 2010, and "A Little Bit Stronger", performed by Sara Evans and released on September 27, 2010. In addition to Paltrow, the film's co-stars Garrett Hedlund, Tim McGraw and Leighton Meester all sing on the soundtrack, which also features country music stars Lee Ann Womack, Hank Williams Jr., and Faith Hill, among others. The album has sold 479,000 copies in the US as of February 2013. A follow-up album Country Strong (More Music from the Motion Picture), was released on December 21, 2010, originally as digital download only. The second album has sold 36,349 in the US as of January 2011.

Critical reception

Stephen Thomas Erlewine of Allmusic wrote the soundtrack "follows the blueprint of its star, McGraw, and the early work of his wife Faith Hill, delivering a collection of crisp, clean, and melodic country where the Hank Williams Jr. cameo is used as rowdy flavoring. If Paltrow never quite sounds convincing as a country singer -- she seems just a little too mannered to be 'Country Strong' -- Gossip Girl Leighton Meester pulls off the sweet 'Words I Couldn’t Say' with ease, and the rest of the soundtrack is handed over to professionals".

Empire Online's Danny Graydon gave the soundtrack a four stars rating out of five explaining Gwyneth Paltrow is really good. "[She] more than holds her own among such esteemed company as Lee Ann Womack (Liars Lie), Hank Williams Jr. (Thirsty) and Faith Hill (Give In To Me), her voice driving the stomping 'Shake That Thing', the anthemic title track, and 'Me & Tennessee', a gorgeous duet with Tim McGraw." Entertainment Weekly writer Mikael Wood was convinced by Paltrow in the title track but not in "Shake That Thing". For the rest, he said "Elsewhere you get solid new songs from the likes of Sara Evans, Ronnie Dunn, and Patty Loveless"

Matt Bjorke of Roughstock described Paltrow's "Country Strong" as a "solid, down the middle 'I will survive' ballad." Though he shared the same opinion as Mikael Wood concerning her performance on "Shake That Thing" by saying the song doesn't suit her, he liked "Coming Home", calling it an "Oscar worthy ballad". He continued, "While Gwyneth acquits herself nicely on two out of three songs, the biggest surprises on the album are her co-stars Garrett Hedlund and Leighton Meester." He praised Hedlund's performance on "Chances Are" by saying "the best song on this album belongs to him." He noted his voice recalls Charlie Robison with a slice of Kris Kristofferson which suits country music quite well. He also explained, "Meester certainly comes off sounding closely along the lines of the folksy singer/songwriters like Colbie Caillat and Sara Bareilles and the obvious comparison, Taylor Swift.

Country Weekly gave the release three stars saying "While the album holds together better than many soundtracks, it’s divided between country songs and pop-country songs. Some are super, some so-so; some are sung by actors (Garrett Hedlund being the most convincing of the bunch) and some are delivered by serious country singers."

The Boston Phoenix was negative about the soundtrack, "This steaming pile of songs is emblematic of the state of mainstream country music – all artifice, no heart, calculated anthems written to formula and meant, like the film itself, to do no more than capitalize on the genre's current success and rob its undiscriminating fans." He found Paltrow's performances "pointless". He also disliked the tracks by Sara Evans, Lee Ann Womack, Trace Adkins, and Tim McGraw because of their lack of character. He pointed out the drinking songs – Hank Williams Jr.'s "Thirsty" and Ronnie Dunn's "She's Actin' Single (I'm Drinkin' Doubles)" – are the only ones "offering humor and humanity".

Track listing

Production

Original motion-picture soundtrack
According to The Boot:
Byron Gallimore – tracks 1, 7, 12
James Stroud – track 2
Tony Brown – track 3
Frank Liddell and Luke Wooten – track 4
Frank Liddell and Chuck Ainlay – track 5
Ronnie Dunn – track 6
Michael Knox – track 8
Jay Joyce – track 9
Kenny Beard – track 10
Nathan Chapman – track 11
Byron Gallimore, Tim McGraw, A. Martin – track 13

Chart performance

Album

Country Strong (Original Motion Picture Soundtrack)

Country Strong (More Music from the Motion Picture)

Singles

Other charted songs

ADid not enter the Hot 100 but charted on Bubbling Under Hot 100 Singles.

Certifications

References

External links
 Official website

2010 soundtrack albums
Drama film soundtracks
RCA Records soundtracks
Country music soundtracks